Clarence John "Taffy" Abel (May 28, 1900 – August 1, 1964) was an American professional ice hockey player who played in the National Hockey League with the New York Rangers and Chicago Black Hawks between 1926 and 1934. Born in 1900 in Sault Ste. Marie, Michigan, United States, as a Native American Ojibwe, he was forced to hide his Native American ancestry until 1939. He was a silver medalist in ice hockey at the 1924 Winter Olympics and the U.S. flagbearer for those games, being the earliest known Native American to be a US Olympic flagbearer. He was a member of two Stanley Cup championship teams. On November 16, 1926 with the New York Rangers he became the first United States-born Native American player to become an NHL regular. He is a member of the United States Hockey Hall of Fame.

Playing career
Clarence "Taffy" Abel was a silver medalist on the United States in the 1924 Olympics, serving as flagbearer for the U.S. delegation. Abel scored 15 goals for the United States in the tournament.

As a member of the Minneapolis Millers of the CHL during the 1925–26 season, Abel was named to the CHL's First All-Star team at the defense position.

Abel played in the NHL for eight years. He scored his first NHL goal on December 7, 1926 in the New York Rangers' 1-0 road victory over the Boston Bruins.

He was signed by Conn Smythe to the New York Rangers, largely based upon his strong performance at the Winter Olympics in 1924. With the Rangers, he wore sweater number 4, and, paired with defenseman Ching Johnson, was a key member of the Stanley Cup winning Rangers team in 1927-28. After the 1929 season, Abel's rights were sold to the Chicago Black Hawks, where he played five more years, wearing sweater number 2. Abel was a member of the Cup-winning Black Hawks in 1933-34, his last NHL season.

Later life and legacy
Abel returned to Sault Ste. Marie after retirement, coaching ice hockey. He also operated a tourist resort named "Taffy’s Lodge" in Sault Ste. Marie, Michigan.

Abel died in his home in Sault Ste. Marie, on August 1, 1964, aged 64. Nine years later, he was inducted into the United States Hockey Hall of Fame as a player.

The Taffy Abel Arena, home rink for the Lake Superior State University hockey program is named in his honor.

Career statistics

Regular season and playoffs

International

References

External links
 
 NPR: Taffy Abel medaled in the 1924 Olympics. Few knew of his Indigenous heritage.
 

1900 births
1964 deaths
20th-century Native Americans
American men's ice hockey defensemen
Chicago Blackhawks players
Central Hockey League (1925–1926) players
Ice hockey players at the 1924 Winter Olympics
Ice hockey players from Michigan
Medalists at the 1924 Winter Olympics
Native American sportspeople
New York Rangers players
Olympic silver medalists for the United States in ice hockey
People from Sault Ste. Marie, Michigan
St. Paul Athletic Club ice hockey players
Stanley Cup champions
United States Hockey Hall of Fame inductees
Ojibwe people